The 15th G7 Summit was held in the business district of La Défense to the west of Paris, France between 14 and 16 July 1989.  The venue for the summit meetings was the Grande Arche which was rushed to completion for celebrations marking the bicentennial of the French Revolution and for the world economic summit meeting that was held in the top of the Arche. This event was also called the "Summit of the Arch."

The Group of Seven (G7) was an unofficial forum which brought together the heads of the richest industrialized countries: France, West Germany, Italy, Japan, the United Kingdom, the United States, Canada (since 1976), and the President of the European Commission (starting officially in 1981). The summits were not meant to be linked formally with wider international institutions; and in fact, a mild rebellion against the stiff formality of other international meetings was a part of the genesis of cooperation between France's president Valéry Giscard d'Estaing and West Germany's chancellor Helmut Schmidt as they conceived the first Group of Six (G6) summit in 1975.

Leaders at the summit
The G7 is an unofficial annual forum for the leaders of Canada, the European Commission, France, Germany, Italy, Japan, the United Kingdom, and the United States.

The 15th G7 summit was the first summit for US President George H. W. Bush and was the last summit for Italian Prime Minister Ciriaco De Mita. It was also the first and only summit for Japanese Prime Minister Sōsuke Uno.

Participants
These summit participants are the current "core members" of the international forum:

The heads of state and government of over a dozen developing countries were also represented at this summit gathering in Paris.

Issues
The summit was intended as a venue for resolving differences among its members. As a practical matter, the summit was also conceived as an opportunity for its members to give each other mutual encouragement in the face of difficult economic decisions. Issues which were discussed at this summit included:
 International Economic Situation
 International Monetary Developments and Coordination
 Improving Economic Efficiency
 Trade Issues
 General Problems of Development
 The Situation in the Poorest Countries
 Strengthened Debt Strategy for the Heavily Indebted Countries
 Environment
 Drug Issues
 International Cooperation against AIDS

Gallery

Accomplishments
While the agenda-setting or parameter-setting functions of the summit are important, the associated action or inaction which comes afterwards is important as well. These remain conceptually distinct aspects of the G7 summits.

A symbol of the mixed legacy of this summit is the Grande Arche itself. The total expenditure on the building reached 3.74 billion francs, all but 5.7 percent of which was covered by private investors, with the state remaining owner of the roof area; and yet, in 2001, parts of the facade were falling off. A Frommer's review in 2010 characterizes it as a "politician's folly."

In 1989, the summit leaders called for "adoption of sustainable forest management practices, with a view to preserving the scale of the world's forests," but there is little evidence of follow-up action.

See also
 G8

Notes

References
 Bayne, Nicholas and Robert D. Putnam. (2000).  Hanging in There: The G7 and G8 Summit in Maturity and Renewal. Aldershot, Hampshire: Ashgate Publishing. ; OCLC 43186692
 Hajnal, Peter I. (1999).  The G8 system and the G20 : Evolution, Role and Documentation. Aldershot, Hampshire: Ashgate Publishing.  ; 
 Kokotsis, Eleonore. (1999).  Keeping International Commitments: Compliance, Credibility, and the G7, 1988-1995. New York: Garland Publishing. ; 
 Reinalda, Bob and Bertjan Verbeek. (1998).  Autonomous Policy Making by International Organizations. London: Routledge.  ; ;

External links
 No official website is created for any G7 summit prior to 1995 -- see the 21st G7 summit.
 University of Toronto: G8 Research Group, G8 Information Centre
 G7 1989, delegations & documents

G7 summit
G7 summit
1989 in international relations
1989 in Paris
G7 summit 1989
G7 summit 1989
Events in Paris
1989
July 1989 events in Europe